Pseudeutreta quadrigutta is a species of tephritid or fruit flies in the genus Pseudeutreta of the family Tephritidae.

Distribution
South America.

References

Tephritinae
Diptera of South America
Insects described in 1853
Taxa named by Francis Walker (entomologist)